Hossein Rabbi  (born 21 March 1947 in zanjan, Iran) is an Iranian former long-distance runner who competed in the 1976 Summer Olympics in Montreal, Quebec, Canada

He specialized in the 5000 metres and 10,000 metres.

References

1947 births
Living people
Iranian male marathon runners
Iranian male long-distance runners
Olympic athletes of Iran
Athletes (track and field) at the 1976 Summer Olympics
Iranian male cross country runners
People from Zanjan, Iran